Nipponaphera suduirauti is a species of sea snail, a marine gastropod mollusk in the family Cancellariidae, the nutmeg snails.

References

 Bouchet P. & Petit R.E. (2008). New species and new records of southwest Pacific Cancellariidae. The Nautilus 122(1): 1-18.

suduirauti
Gastropods described in 1999